Two referendums were held in Switzerland in January and May 1879. A federal law on subsidies for railways in the Alps was passed by 70.7% of voters on 19 January, whilst a referendum on abolishing the constitutional ban on the death penalty on 18 May was passed by 52.5% of voters and a majority of cantons. Following the vote, ten of the 26 cantons reintroduced the death penalty during the 1880s and 1890s and nine executions occurred before its nationwide abolition in 1938, when a new criminal code (which overrode cantonal penal codes) was approved in a referendum.

Background
The January referendum on rail subsidies was classed as an optional referendum, which meant that only a majority of the public vote was required for the proposals to be approved. The referendum on the death penalty involved amending article 65 of the federal constitution, and was a mandatory referendum, which required both a majority of voters and cantons to approve the proposals.

Results

Federal law on rail subsidies

Constitutional amendment on the death penalty

References

Switzerland
1879 in Switzerland
Referendums in Switzerland
Capital punishment